La ilustre fregona is a 1928 Spanish film directed by Armando Pou, starring Mari Muniain, Ángel de Zomeño, Modesto Rivas and Juan Romero. It is based on the story La ilustre fregona by Miguel de Cervantes.

The film was produced for Venus Film Española. It premiered at the Palacio de la Música in Madrid on 26 March 1928.

References

External links
 

1928 films
Spanish silent films
1920s Spanish-language films
Films based on works by Miguel de Cervantes
Spanish black-and-white films